George Nicholson (born 12 May 1905, date of death unknown) was an English professional footballer. He was born in Pelaw, Gateshead, County Durham.

Career

Nicholson did not begin his professional football career until the relatively late age of twenty-five. He had been working as a miner while playing amateur football but in 1931 he was spotted by a scout from Bolton Wanderers. The scout had originally travelled to the match to watch another player but quickly moved to sign up Nicholson. He made his debut in a 2–2 draw with Liverpool in September 1931 and was a regular for the club until he was displaced by Harry Goslin. He spent time in the clubs reserves and jumped at the chance to play first team football again when he signed for Cardiff City in 1936. He was one of seven new signings made by the club in an attempt to steady the club which had been in decline for several years. He remained with the club for three years before signing for Oldham Athletic in 1939, however the outbreak of World War II soon after meant he never made an appearance for the club.

References

1905 births
English footballers
Bolton Wanderers F.C. players
Cardiff City F.C. players
Oldham Athletic A.F.C. players
English Football League players
Footballers from Gateshead
Year of death missing
Association football midfielders